The Royal Highland and Agricultural Society of Scotland (RHASS) was founded in Edinburgh in 1784 as the Highland Society of Edinburgh. The Society is responsible for organising the annual Royal Highland Show.

History
The Society had its root in 1723 when the Society of Improvers of the Knowledge of Agriculture in Scotland was created in Edinburgh. This society was abandoned in 1746. A similar society under the name Highland Society of Scotland was created in 1784 with 100 members largely in reaction to the subsistence crises of 1782/3 when many of the estates in the highlands and islands of Scotland were not producing enough food to feed tenants.

It received a royal charter in 1787 becoming the "Royal Highland Society of Scotland" at which membership rose to 150. By the 1870s membership grew to 4650. The society granted bursaries for education and also ran the Argyll Fund, which educated "young highland gentleman" for the Navy, which was instigated by John Campbell, 5th Duke of Argyll.

In 1828 they began the "Quarterly Journal of Agriculture". From the same time they were housed in a purpose built building on George IV Bridge at the head of Victoria Street in Edinburgh's Old Town. The building also held an agricultural museum. Now attached to Edinburgh Central Library in houses the music library.

Famous members include Henry Mackenzie (a Director), Sir Walter Scott and James MacDonald, secretary from 1893 to 1912.

See also
 Highland Society of London
 Royal Highland Showground

References

External links 
 
 

Organizations established in 1784
18th century in Scotland
Organisations based in Edinburgh
Charities based in Scotland
Agricultural organisations based in Scotland
Organisations based in Scotland with royal patronage
1784 establishments in Scotland